The Highlight routine competition at the 2022 World Aquatics Championships was held on 23 and 25 June 2022.

Results
The preliminary round was started on 23 June at 10:00. The final was held on 25 June at 15:00.

References

Highlight routine